Mithaka (also Midhaga, Mitaka) is an extinct Australian Aboriginal language in the Barcoo Shire of Western Queensland spoken by the Mitaka people.

Classification and dialects 
Karruwali (Garuwali) and Marulta (Marrulha, Marrula) are counted as dialects per Dixon (2002).

Breen thinks Mithaka, Marula, and Marunuda may be the same language but does not know if they are alternative names or distinct dialects of the same language.

However, Bowern (2001) states that there is not enough evidence to classify them, or even to establish that they are Karnic languages.

References

External links 
 Bibliography of Garuwali people and language resources, at the Australian Institute of Aboriginal and Torres Strait Islander Studies

Karnic languages
Extinct languages of Queensland